The office of Minister-President, or Prime Minister, of Prussia existed from 1848, when it was formed by King Frederick William IV during the 1848–49 Revolution, until the abolition of Prussia in 1947 by the Allied Control Council.

History of the office
Under the Kingdom of Prussia the Minister President functioned as the chief minister of the King, and presided over the Landtag (the Prussian legislature established in 1848). After the unification of Germany in 1871 and until the collapse in 1918, the office of the Prussian Minister President was usually held by the Chancellor of the German Empire, beginning with the tenure of Otto von Bismarck.

Under the Free State of Prussia the Minister President was the head of the state government in a more traditional parliamentary role during the Weimar Republic. The office ceased to have any real meaning except as a kind of political patronage title after the takeover by the national government in 1932 (Preußenschlag), and after Nazi Germany dismantled Prussia as a state in 1935 (Reichsstatthaltergesetz). Eventually, the office was abolished along with Prussia itself by the Allies after World War II.

Chief Ministers of the Kingdom of Prussia (1702–1848)
1702–1711: Johann Kasimir Kolbe von Wartenberg 
1711–1728: 
1728–1739: Friedrich Wilhelm von Grumbkow
1739–1749: 
1749–1753: 
1749–1777: Count Karl-Wilhelm Finck von Finckenstein
1777–1802: 
1786–1798: 
1802–1804: Count Christian Heinrich Kurt von Haugwitz (1st term)
1804–1806: Count Karl August von Hardenberg (1st term)
1806: Count Christian Heinrich Kurt von Haugwitz (2nd term)
1806–1807: 
1807: Count Karl August von Hardenberg (2nd term)
1807–1808: Baron Heinrich Friedrich Karl vom und zum Stein
1808–1810: Count Karl Friedrich Ferdinand Alexander zu Dohna-Schlobitten
1810–1822: Prince Karl August von Hardenberg (3rd term)
1822–1823: 
1823–1841: Count Carl Friedrich Heinrich, Graf von Wylich und Lottum
1841–1848:

List of Ministers President of Prussia (1848–1945)

Ministers-President of the Kingdom of Prussia (1848–1918)
Political Party:

Ministers-President of the Free State of Prussia (1918–1945)
Political Party:

See also
Deputy Prime Minister of Prussia
Minister-president
List of monarchs of Prussia
Constitution of Prussia (1848)
List of chancellors of Germany

 
Prussia
Min
1848 establishments in Prussia
1947 disestablishments in Prussia